The Paraná grass mouse (Akodon paranaensis) is a South American rodent species of the family Cricetidae. It is found in northeastern Argentina and southeastern Brazil.

References 

paranaensis
Mammals of Argentina
Mammals of Brazil
 
Mammals described in 2000